Lloyd Lowndes Jr. (February 21, 1845 – January 8, 1905), a member of the United States Republican Party, was an American attorney and politician, the 43rd Governor of Maryland from 1896 to 1900 and a member of the U.S. House of Representatives from the sixth district of Maryland from 1873 to 1875.

Early life and education
He was born in 1845 in Clarksburg, Virginia (now West Virginia), son of Lloyd Lowndes and Elizabeth Moore; he was a great-grandson of early Bladensburg, Maryland settler, Christopher Lowndes (1713–1785). He attended Allegheny College in Pennsylvania, where he was a member of Phi Kappa Psi fraternity. He graduated from the law department of the University of Pennsylvania at Philadelphia in 1867.

Marriage and family
He married his first cousin, Elizabeth Tasker Lowndes, daughter of Richard Tasker Lowndes and Louisa Black.

Political career
After starting his law practice, Lowndes turned to politics. He found that the Democratic Party was regaining political control in Maryland. After being elected to one term in Congress in 1872, he did not succeed in gaining re-election after his term ended in 1875. He returned to his law practice.

At the end of the century, however, Lowndes ran for governor in 1896, was supported by a strong Republican biracial coalition, and won the election. In addition, Maryland was one of several "border states" that had voted for Republican candidate William McKinley in a major sweep that showed a realignment nationally; Lowndes and some Republican state legislators and congressmen, such as Sydney Emanuel Mudd, were likely also elected on McKinley's coattails. McKinley's win ended free silver as an issue and American society embraced its industrial present.

Lowndes died in 1905 of heart failure, in Cumberland, Maryland, and is buried at the Rose Hill Cemetery there.

References

External links

National Governors Association, Governor's Information: Maryland Governor Lloyd Lowndes Jr.

1845 births
1905 deaths
19th-century American politicians
Allegheny College alumni
Burials at Rose Hill Cemetery (Cumberland, Maryland)
Republican Party governors of Maryland
Politicians from Clarksburg, West Virginia
Republican Party members of the United States House of Representatives from Maryland
University of Pennsylvania Law School alumni
19th-century American Episcopalians
Lawyers from Clarksburg, West Virginia